Karl Burckhardt-Iselin (2 July 1830, in Basel – 24 August 1893) was a Swiss politician and President of the Swiss National Council (1880/1881).

External links 
 
 

1830 births
1893 deaths
Politicians from Basel-Stadt
Swiss Calvinist and Reformed Christians
Free Democratic Party of Switzerland politicians
Members of the National Council (Switzerland)
Presidents of the National Council (Switzerland)
Mayors of places in Switzerland